The Bentonville Mustangs (previously the Bentonville Officeholders), based in Bentonville, Arkansas, were a minor league baseball team that played in the Arkansas State League in 1934 and 1935 and the Arkansas–Missouri League in 1936.

External links
Baseball Reference

Baseball teams established in 1934
Baseball teams disestablished in 1936
Professional baseball teams in Arkansas
Defunct Arkansas State League teams
Defunct Arkansas-Missouri League teams
St. Louis Cardinals minor league affiliates
Defunct minor league baseball teams
Defunct baseball teams in Arkansas